Diyalo Bangala is a former palace used by the Nepalese royal family.

It is located in Bharatpur, Nepal, near the Madan Ashrit Highway. Diyalo Bangala was built in the 1960s by King Mahendra. King Mahendra died at this palace on 31 January 1972.

References 

Buildings and structures in Bharatpur, Nepal
Palaces in Nepal
Royal residences in Nepal
Tourist attractions in Bagmati Province
Shah palaces of Nepal
1960s establishments in Nepal